Albulena is an Albanian feminine first name. The name comes from the Battle of Albulena in 1457, in which Albanian national hero Skanderbeg won a famous victory over a much larger Ottoman force. It is not a common name and is only in the top 1000 of names for a baby girl. According to devorname.com the name is most common in Kosovo with 2812, followed by Sweden with 116 people and Albania with 87 people.

People
Albulena Haxhiu, Kosovar Albanian politician of the party Vetëvendosje!, from Pristina (11 May 1987–)
Albulena Ukaj, Albanian singer
Albulena Hulaj, Kosovar Albanian fashion designer, from Prizren

References

Albanian feminine given names